Kevin Greer (known as The Blue Paint Killer) is a fictional character featured in the third and fifth season of the CBS drama CSI: Crime Scene Investigation. He was portrayed by Taylor Nichols.

Victims
 Janet Kent (1987) – an art student who was taught by, and dated, Cody Lewis
 Marcia Reese (1987) – another student at WLVU
 Charlene Roth (1988) - killed by John Mathers executed 15 years later 
 Debbie Reston (2002) – killed on the day of John Mathers' execution
 Jonathan Avery Haywood (III) (2004) – killed by mistake due to resemblance to Kaitlin Rakish
 Kaitlin Rackish (2004) – a student of Cody Lewis

Modus operandi
The killer applies blue house paint to railings in the fictional Western Las Vegas University campus; he chooses the railings because they are near a water fountain. Motor oil is mixed into the paint to slow the drying process. He waits for the female victim to touch the railing and then, with the victim attempting to wash the paint off her hand at the water fountain, he attacks her, binds and gags her, bundles her into a van, and drives away from the site. He then stops the van outside an erotic boutique and sketches while his victim pleads for mercy. He draws her while he sits in the driver's seat looking at her through the rearview mirror as she struggles in the back. He then sexually assaults her before strangling her to death. After he kills his victim, he dumps her, in a black garbage bag, around Las Vegas and sells his sketches to the owner of the boutique.

The exception to this M.O. is Jonathan Avery Haywood III, killed in "What's Eating Gilbert Grissom?". As Haywood is mistaken for Kaitlin Rakish, the killer does not assault or sketch him and disposes of the body by feeding it into a wood chipper on campus.

Suspects

John Mathers

John Mathers was a security guard who worked at WLVU in 1987 when the killings began. He was arrested and convicted in 1988 after one of his hairs was found on Charlene Roth's body. He remains on Death Row for 15 years until he is executed for Charlene Roth's murder ("The Execution of Catherine Willows"). However, another victim (Debbie Reston) is found on the day of the execution. Believing Mathers to be a copycat of the real killer, the CSIs tried to find the real culprit; due to a lack of evidence, however, the case goes cold.

Following another pair of murders in "What's Eating Gilbert Grissom?", it transpires that Mathers and Greer are partners. They are clearly quite close, with Greer referring to his partner as "JM", although he also says that capture and execution is "the price you pay for being incompetent". Gil Grissom determines that Kevin Greer is the "alpha male" of the two partners.

Cody Lewis
Lewis (David Lee Smith) is an art professor at WLVU who dated the first victim, Janet Kent, and taught art to Kaitlin Rakish and several of the other victims. He was originally in the frame for the 1987–88 murders but was later exonerated by the same DNA evidence which convicted John Mathers.

Kevin Greer's background and story
Kevin Greer worked at the WLVU's campus from 1983 to 2004 and was the only employee of the press to have worked there for more than 10 years when he was caught. He also had a job writing explicit comic books for a sex shop, under the pseudonym of Zippy T. He commits the first murder at the approximate age of 16 prior to the events of "The Execution of Catherine Willows", estimated from the show's chronology to be in 1987. In 1988, John Mathers is arrested and placed on death row for 15 years; in that time Greer stopped his killing spree so that Mathers would die and take the blame to his grave. On the day of Mathers' execution, Greer kills his fourth victim, Debbie Reston. Although he intends to kill one victim every year on that day, he does not do so in 2003 because unsuccessful LASIK surgery had temporarily damaged his eyesight (he elected to have the surgery because Debbie Reston broke his glasses in a struggle). The following year, however, he kills Jonathan Haywood, mistaking him for his intended target Kaitlin Rackish because Haywood had long hair and Greer's poor post-LASIK night vision led him to mistake Haywood for a woman. He later tracks Kaitlin down and kills her, but the evidence that he leaves behind at the crime scene (photocopier toner from the WLVU press) leads to his arrest.

After SWAT raids his house, Greer leaves a phone message saying that he would be waiting for Grissom at the police station. When Grissom and Brass arrive, Greer greets them as "Gil" and "Jim", and taunts them about their search. Greer then promises to lead the officers to the location of a sixth victim, Brit Mosscoe. However, this is a ruse (Brit Mosscoe is an anagram of "Miss October", from a calendar hanging in Greer's garage). He asks to go to the bathroom before he leaves, and although an officer escorts him into the facilities after being searched, he goes unattended into a cubicle. After Sara Sidle calls Catherine to inform the others of the deception, Grissom, and Brass break into the cubicle and find Greer with a black plastic bag tied around his head. They tear the bag off and attempt CPR, but Greer is already dead.

Returning to the interrogation room, Grissom finds a drawing which, when folded, reveals a picture of Grissom and the word "goodbye".

See also
List of CSI: Crime Scene Investigation characters

References

CSI: Crime Scene Investigation characters
Fictional cartoonists
Fictional serial killers
Fictional rapists
Television characters introduced in 2002
Fictional suicides